Álvaro Pires may refer to:
Álvaro Pires (footballer) (born 1985), Brazilian footballer
Alvaro Pires (professor), Canadian law professor
Álvaro Pires (swimmer) (born 1941), Brazilian swimmer